The 2018 California Secretary of State election was held on November 6, 2018, to elect the California Secretary of State. Incumbent Democratic Secretary Alex Padilla won re-election to a second term.

Primary election

Candidates

Democratic Party

Declared
 Alex Padilla, California Secretary of state
 Ruben Major, paramedic

Republican Party

Declared
 Mark P. Meuser, election law attorney
 Raul Rodriguez Jr., warehousing employee

Green Party

Declared
 Michael Feinstein, former mayor of Santa Monica, Electoral Reform Consultant
 Erik Rydberg, electoral reform advocate, Community Organizer

Libertarian Party
 Gail Lightfoot, retired nurse

Peace and Freedom Party

Declared
 C.T. Weber, retired government analyst

Endorsements

Results

General election

Predictions

Results

References

External links
Mark Meuser (R) for Secretary of State
Alex Padilla (D) for Secretary of State

Secretary of State
2018
California
November 2018 events in the United States